is a passenger railway station in located in the city of Suzuka,  Mie Prefecture, Japan, operated by the private railway operator Kintetsu Railway.

Lines
Yanagi Station is a station on the Suzuka Line, and is located 2.2 rail kilometers from the opposing terminus of the line at Ise-Wakamatsu Station.

Station layout
The station consists of a single side platform served by a single track. There is no station building. The station is unattended.

Platforms

Adjacent stations

History
Yanagi Station opened on December 20, 1925 as a station on the Ise Railway’s Kambe Spur Line. The Ise Railway became the Sangu Express Electric Railway’s Ise-Kambe Line on September 15, 1936, and was renamed the Nagoya Line on December 7, 1938. After merging with Osaka Electric Kido on March 15, 1941, the line became the Kansai Express Railway's Nagoya Line. This line was merged with the Nankai Electric Railway on June 1, 1944 to form Kintetsu. It was renamed the Suzuka Line on April 8, 1963 The station has been unattended since October 1, 1994.

Passenger statistics
In fiscal 2019, the station was used by an average of 183 passengers daily (boarding passengers only).

Surrounding area
 Japan National Route 23

See also
List of railway stations in Japan

References

External links

 Kintetsu: Yanagi Station

Railway stations in Japan opened in 1925
Railway stations in Mie Prefecture
Suzuka, Mie
Stations of Kintetsu Railway